Anirvan Ghosh is an American neuroscientist and Biotech executive.

He served as the Global Head of Neuroscience Discovery at F. Hoffmann-La Roche from 2011 to 2016 and as founding CSO of E-Scape Bio from 2016 to 2017. He was the Head of Research and Early Development at Biogen from 2017 to 2020 and is currently the CEO of Unity Biotechnology.

Biography

Anirvan Ghosh was born in 1964 in Bloomington, Indiana and grew up in Kanpur, India. After completing high school at Central School (Kendriya Vidyalaya) IIT Kanpur, he moved to the U.S. to pursue his undergraduate education at the California Institute of Technology. He graduated with a B.S. with honors in Physics from Caltech in 1985.  From 1985 to 1990 he was a graduate student in the Stanford University Neurosciences Graduate Program, where he worked on the role of subplate neurons in establishing cortical connections in the laboratory of Carla J. Shatz. He received his Ph.D. in Neurobiology from Stanford University in 1991. His postdoctoral training was with Michael E. Greenberg at Harvard Medical School where he worked on regulation of differentiation by extracellular signals and calcium regulation of BDNF expression. From 1995 to 2003 he was on the faculty in the Department of Neuroscience at the Johns Hopkins School of Medicine.  While at Johns Hopkins he cloned CREST as a calcium-regulated transcription factor and showed that it plays a critical role in brain development. In 2003 he moved to  UCSD as the Stephen Kuffler Professor and served as Chair of Neurobiology in the Division of Biological Sciences. Ghosh served as the Global Head of Neuroscience Discovery at Roche from 2011 to 2016  and as the Head of Research and Early Development at Biogen from 2017 to 2020. Since 2020 he has served as CEO of UNITY Biotechnology, a company focused on developing therapies to slow, halt, or reverse diseases of aging.

Publications
Ghosh, A., A. Antonini, S.K. McConnell and C.J. Shatz (1990).  Requirement for subplate neurons in the formation of thalamocortical connections.  Nature 347: 179-181
Ghosh, A. and C.J. Shatz (1992).  Involvement of subplate neurons in the formation of ocular dominance columns. Science 255:1441-1443.
Ghosh, A., J. Carnahan and M.E. Greenberg (1994).  Requirement for BDNF in activity-dependent survival of cortical neurons. Science 263:1618-1623.
Ghosh, A. and M.E. Greenberg (1995).  Distinct roles for bFGF and NT3 in the regulation of cortical neurogenesis. Neuron 15:89-103.
Polleux, F., R.J. Giger, D.D. Ginty, A.L. Kolodkin, and A. Ghosh (1998).  Patterning of cortical efferent projections by semaphorin-neuropilin interactions. Science 282:1904-1906.
Polleux, F., T. Morrow and A. Ghosh (2000).  Semaphorin 3A is a chemoattractant for developing cortical dendrites. Nature 404:567-573.
Aizawa, H., Hu, S-C, Bobb, K., Balakrishnan, K., Ince, G., Gurevich, I., Cowan, M., and A. Ghosh (2004). Dendrite development regulated by CREST, a calcium-regulated transcription activator. Science 303:197-202.
Qiu, Z. and A. Ghosh (2008) A calcium-dependent switch in a CREST-BRG1 complex regulates activity-dependent gene expression. Neuron 60:775-787.
Sylwestrak, E and A. Ghosh (2012) Elfn1 regulates target-specific release probability at CA1-interneuron synapses. Science 338:536-540.

References

External links 
Official page: Anirvan Ghosh, Professor of Biology, UCSD
The Ghosh Lab
Science Daily: Gene Essential For Development Of Normal Brain Connections Resulting From Sensory Input Discovered
Science: Dendrite Development Regulated by CREST, a Calcium-Regulated Transcriptional Activator
Johns Hopkins University Gazette: Heads up! The Brain Behind The Acclaim, by Michael Purdy
Fundamental Neuroscience, Elsevier
Directory of Pew Scholars
BIOGEN press release
UNITY BIOTECHNOLOGY press release

1964 births
Bengali scientists
American people of Bengali descent
American neuroscientists
People from Kanpur
California Institute of Technology alumni
Stanford University alumni
Harvard Medical School alumni
Johns Hopkins University faculty
University of California, San Diego faculty
Living people
Kendriya Vidyalaya alumni
Bengali people
American academics of Indian descent
Scientists from California
Indian scholars